The 2019–20 season was Wigan Athletic's 88th year in existence and their second consecutive season in the Championship. Along with competing in the league, the club also participated in the FA Cup and the EFL Cup. The season covered the period from 1 July 2019 to 22 July 2020.

On 1 July 2020, Wigan announced the club had gone into administration as a result of the COVID-19 pandemic, which had taken a toll on its finances. The EFL handed a 12-point penalty to the club as a result. This, however, did not put a halt to their run of good form and on 14 July, Wigan defeated Hull City 8–0, the biggest league win in the club's history. Despite losing just once in their last fifteen games, Wigan were relegated to League One due to the points deduction.

First-team squad

Transfers

Transfers in

Loans in

Transfers out

Loans out

Pre-season
Wigan confirmed their pre-season schedule in June 2019.

Competitions

Championship

League table

Results summary

Results by matchday

Matches
On Thursday, 20 June 2019, the EFL Championship fixtures were revealed.

FA Cup

The third round draw was made live on BBC Two from Etihad Stadium, Micah Richards and Tony Adams conducted the draw.

EFL Cup

The first round draw was made on 20 June.

Statistics

Appearances & Goals 

|-
!colspan=14|Players out on loan:

|-
!colspan=14|Players who have left the club:

|}

Goals record

Disciplinary record

References

Wigan Athletic F.C. seasons
Wigan Athletic